Sandrine Bonnaire (born 31 May 1967) is a French actress, film director and screenwriter who has appeared in more than 40 films. She won the César Award for Most Promising Actress for À Nos Amours (1983), the César Award for Best Actress for Vagabond (1985) and the Volpi Cup for Best Actress for La Cérémonie (1995). Her other films include Under the Sun of Satan (1987), Monsieur Hire (1989), East/West (1999) and The Final Lesson (2015).

Life and career

Bonnaire was born in the town of Gannat, Allier, in the Auvergne region. She was born into a working-class family, the seventh of eleven children. She grew up in Grigny, Essonne. Her acting career began in 1983, when she starred in the Maurice Pialat film À Nos Amours at age 16, as a girl from Paris beginning her sexual awakening. In 1984 she received the César Award for Most Promising Actress.

Her international breakthrough came in 1985 with her portrayal of the main character, a vagrant who fails both physically and morally, in Vagabond (Sans toit ni loi), directed by Agnès Varda. The film earned Bonnaire her second César Award. Vagabond premiered at the 42nd Venice International Film Festival, where it won the Golden Lion. The jury deemed Bonnaire's performance among the best of the year, but decided against awarding her the Volpi Cup for Best Actress prize because both the actresses they judged to have given the best performances were in films that won major awards.

Bonnaire worked again with Pialat on Under the Sun of Satan (Sous le soleil de Satan) which won the Palme d'Or at the 1987 Cannes Film Festival. Monsieur Hire, directed by Patrice Leconte, followed in 1989, along with further work with directors Jacques Doillon and Claude Sautet.

In 1995, Bonnaire starred as an apparently simple maid in Claude Chabrol's widely acclaimed thriller La Cérémonie. The film and its stars won awards internationally, including Best Actress at the 52nd Venice Film Festival for both Bonnaire and co-star Isabelle Huppert.

In 2004, Bonnaire starred in another Leconte film, Intimate Strangers, which was an arthouse box-office hit in the United States.

In 2017, Bonnaire starred in Gaël Morel's film about reverse immigration, Prendre le large. At the 8th Magritte Awards she received an Honorary Magritte Award from the Académie André Delvaux.

Personal life
Bonnaire has a daughter from a relationship with actor William Hurt, whom she met in 1991 during filming of the Albert Camus novel The Plague (La Peste). They acted together in Secrets Shared with a Stranger (1994). In 2003, she married actor and screenwriter Guillaume Laurant, with whom she has a second daughter. They divorced in 2015.

Selected filmography

As actress

As director/screenwriter

Awards and nominations

References

External links

 
 Sandrine Bonnaire's Cinématon – A 4 minutes online portrait by Gérard Courant
 
 Sandrine Bonnaire at Film Reference
 Sandrine Bonnaire at Allocine 

1967 births
Living people
20th-century French actresses
21st-century French actresses
Best Actress César Award winners
French film actresses
French film directors
French television actresses
French women film directors
French women screenwriters
French screenwriters
Magritte Award winners
Most Promising Actress César Award winners
People from Allier
Volpi Cup for Best Actress winners